Hopewell Academy used to be a small private, coeducational, college preparatory school located in Cary, North Carolina.

History 
Hopewell was founded in 2004 by Cecilia Gabriel. It officially opened in 2005 with grades 7–12. The school served grades 6–12. Hopewell closed indefinitely after the 2019-2020 school year, due to a lack of funding.

Academics and student life 
The school had a wide range of extracurricular activities. After school sports included basketball, soccer, volleyball, and cross country. Hopewell is a member of the Central Carolina Athletic Conference.

The school colors were Cardinal and Navy, the mascot was the Tiger, and it was accredited by SACS.

Among other state of the art features and academic programs, it also used to include student organizations including Art Club, Drama Club, and Chess Club.

References

External links

Educational institutions established in 2004
Schools in Wake County, North Carolina
Buildings and structures in Cary, North Carolina
Private high schools in North Carolina
Private middle schools in North Carolina
Private elementary schools in North Carolina
2004 establishments in North Carolina